Dušan Mijić (born 23 January 1965) is a Serbian former football player, manager and administrator.

Career
After starting out at Hajduk Kula, Mijić played for Vojvodina from 1982 to 1991, winning the Yugoslav First League in the 1988–89 season. He later played abroad in Spain (Espanyol and Palamós).

Following his playing days, Mijić served as manager of Armenian Premier League club Ararat Yerevan on two occasions (2007 and 2014).

In December 2016, Mijić was named the president of Vojvodina. He stepped down in September 2017.

Honours
Vojvodina
 Yugoslav First League: 1988–89

References

External links
 
 
 

Association football defenders
Expatriate football managers in Armenia
Expatriate footballers in Spain
FC Ararat Yerevan players
FK Vojvodina players
La Liga players
Palamós CF footballers
RCD Espanyol footballers
Segunda División players
Serbian expatriate football managers
Serbian expatriate sportspeople in Armenia
Serbian football managers
Serbian footballers
Serbs of Bosnia and Herzegovina
Sportspeople from Banja Luka
Yugoslav expatriate footballers
Yugoslav expatriate sportspeople in Spain
Yugoslav First League players
Yugoslav footballers
1965 births
Living people